Jūrmala ("seaside") is a state city in Latvia, about  west of Riga. Jūrmala is a resort town stretching  and sandwiched between the Gulf of Riga and the Lielupe River. It has a  stretch of white-sand beach, and a population of 49,325 in 2019, making it the fifth-largest city in Latvia.

While Latvia was part of the Soviet Union, Jūrmala was a favorite holiday-resort and tourist destination for high-level Communist Party officials, particularly Leonid Brezhnev and Nikita Khrushchev. Although many amenities such as beach-houses and concrete hotels remain, some have fallen into disrepair. Jūrmala remains a tourist attraction with long beaches facing the Gulf of Riga and romantic wooden houses in the Art Nouveau style.

Names and administrative history 
The name Jūrmala stems from Latvian jūra ("sea") and mala ("edge", "side", "margin"), thus "seaside" in English.

In 1920, soon after Latvian independence, the town of Rīgas Jūrmala ("Seaside of Riga") was established. In German it became known as Rigasche Strand and Riga-Strand (Beach of Riga), and advertised as part of Baltische Riviera (the Baltic Riviera)

During World War II, Jūrmala lost its autonomy and by 1946 it was a district of Riga. In 1949 this district was enlarged to include Priedaine. Finally, in 1959 the district of Jūrmala was removed from the city of Riga and merged with the health resorts Sloka and Ķemeri to establish Jūrmalas pilsēta (City of Jūrmala). In publications dating from the Soviet period, the city name was occasionally spelled in English as "Yurmala", a back-transliteration from Russian Юрмала.

As a result of the administrative territorial reform of Latvia in 2009, Jūrmala became one of the republican cities of Latvia (Republikas pilsētas), and is currently (2011) the fifth largest by population. The republican cities were replaced with state cities (Valstspilsētas) after the 2021 administrative reform.

History

The city of Jūrmala actually consists of a string of small resorts. From west to east, these include Ķemeri, Jaunķemeri, Sloka, Kauguri, Vaivari, Asari, Melluži, Pumpuri, Jaundubulti, Dubulti, Majori, Dzintari, Bulduri and Lielupe and others.

Jūrmala's reputation as a spa destination began in the late 18th and early 19th centuries. Wealthy landowners began the tradition of relaxing at the seaside, and Russian army officers came here to rest after the Napoleonic Wars, returning later with their families. The peak of the Jūrmala area's development was the opening of the Riga - Tukums railway in 1877 (which still passes through Jūrmala) that gave a great boost to the numbers of visitors, and thus a boost to the development of the town as a resort. Jūrmala also gained a reputation as a health spa. The sea breeze, pine aroma, mineral springs, and sandy beach encouraged many sanatoriums to develop within the city.

In Soviet times Jūrmala was popular with the Communist officials because of its beach and sanatoriums - holidays were also given as rewards for top union members. It became one of the most popular holiday destinations in the whole Union. The spas offered facilities from mud baths to riding therapy and hiking in the woods. In summer there are many concerts.

Whereas Riga has advanced rapidly to embrace and cater for growing numbers of Western tourists, Jūrmala has lagged behind. Russians are now subject to strict visa requirements and its beaches have yet to attract significant numbers of Europeans, leaving the tourist industry with a hard task on its hands. However, during the past few years, Jūrmala has started to recover. Many Russian celebrities, successful businessmen and others buy houses near the beach, and a variety of festivals and other activities attract increasing crowds each summer. At the moment, Jūrmala has almost resumed the popularity that it had with the Soviet elite.

The main beach at Majori and another at Bulduri now bear blue eco-flags signalling the sea is clean and safe to swim in, and the Latvian Academy of Science boasts a hotel for its members in the town. There is also the Midsummer Festival in June, celebrating the longest day of the year. The "Jaunais Vilnis" New Wave (competition) music festival showcases the latest music from all over Europe. The Lonely Planet guide to the region states that it is one of the highlights of Latvia.

Architecture

The most distinguishing architectural feature in Jūrmala is the prevalence of wooden houses dating from the 19th and first half of the 20th century. Most of the buildings were built by Baltic German and Latvian architects, but there are also works of Russian, Finnish and other architects. Jūrmala's architecture typically falls into classicism, national romanticism, and modern styles. The town has an official list of 414 historical buildings under protection, as well as over 4,000 wooden structures.. Dubulti Station is an example of sculptural concrete shell Modernist architecture.

Beach

The shallow coastal waters are suitable and safe for children. The beach is equipped with playgrounds, small benches, football fields and volleyball courts, as well as descents for prams and wheelchairs. In spring and autumn amber pieces can be found on the beach.

Each region's beach has its own character. In Majori and Bulduri, where the Blue Flag flies, it is possible to rent water bicycles or relax in the beach cafe. In Dubulti and Dzintari competitions in beach football and volleyball take place, but on Pumpuri beach there is kite surfing and windsurfing.

International water sports contests, including rowing, sailing, and waterskiing that take place on the river Lielupe.

Tourist attractions

Livu Akvaparks

Livu Akvaparks in Jūrmala is one of the largest water amusement parks in Northern Europe. The 3 floors of Līvu Akvaparks include more than 20 slides, more than 10 pools of various depths and sizes, attractions for children, a SPA complex with 4 saunas, cold pool, salt chamber, bubble baths and air and underwater massage facilities. The park's area is 11,000m2, but in summers an additional 7 000m2 becomes available to visitors, bringing the total area to 18 000m2 making this the largest closed-type water park in Northern Europe that operates throughout the year. It opened for visitors on 30 December 2003, after almost 2 years of construction and at a cost of more than 16 million euros. Each year it receives 300,000 visitors, of which roughly 45% are Latvians.

Ķemeri National Park

Ķemeri National Park is a national park west of the city of Jūrmala, Latvia. Established in 1997, Ķemeri is the third largest national park in the country by area, covering an area of 381.65 km2. The territory of the park is mostly occupied by forests and mires, the most significant of them being The Great Ķemeri Bog. The Great Kemeri Bog Boardwalk is a popular tourist destination in Ķemeri National Park, Latvia, offering visitors a chance to explore the bog and its inhabitants. A small boardwalk arc (1.4 km) and a great boardwalk arc (3.4 km) is present, with an observation platform that is a popular place with photographers for sunrise and sunset scenes in Latvia, regardless of the season or weather.

Jomas Street
Jomas street is one of the central and oldest streets of Jūrmala, which during its existence has undergone various changes and transformations. Most of the street is a walking boulevard closed to vehicle traffic, and is populated with restaurants, bars, souvenir booths, fruit stalls and a small shopping complex containing a cinema.

Dzintari Forest Park

The Dzintari Forest Park is located near the centre of Jūrmala, with 200 year old pine groves surrounding the park. For leisure there are walkways that weave within the park connecting a skate park, 3 children playgrounds, a cafe, a roller-skate path (with skiing available in winter), basketball courts and a free-to-enter watchtower.

The Dzintari watchtower at 33.5 meters high, soars past the pine trees with a large viewing platform at the top allowing tall distant objects to be seen such as the Riga Radio and TV Tower. Throughout the entire height of the watchtower a total of 12 platforms are formed, overlooking all directions.

It also includes a paid obstacle course in the trees with 5 routes and a 250m zip line.

Jurmala Open Air Museum and Ragakapa Nature Park
Jurmala Open Air Museum located east of Bulduri celebrates the cities fishing heritage. A fisherman's court has been set up, and its nearly 2,000 exhibits portray the fishermen's work and life in Jūrmala in the 19th and 20th centuries. Nearby Ragakāpa Nature park, this is a natural 800 m long and 100 m wide dune formed out of wind-activity, with viewing platforms and an eco-trail present.

Lielupe
The 116km long river Lielupe flows within Jūrmala. It is popular amongst canoeists and kayakers as Lielupe flows through and connects populated municipalities including Bauska, Mežotne, Jelgava, Kalnciems and Riga. In addition waterskiing, fishing, boat cruising and taking summer ferry trips are popular.

Ķemeri Hotel (Sanatorium) Building

Ķemeri hotel (sanatorium) building is one of the most prominent neo-attraction examples in Latvian architecture. In 1936, President Kārlis Ulmanis officially opened one of the most prestigious buildings in Latvia at the time, Hotel "Ķemeri" with 100 comfortable rooms and a luxurious hall. The building was designed by architect Eizen Laube and was built by public funds.

After World War II, it was transformed into a sanatorium with 300 beds for treating problems with nervous systems, as well as patients with joint, bones and musculoskeletal and gynaecological diseases from the Soviet republics with a very wide range of health resorts and medical services. After the restoration of Latvia's independence, the building was privatised and its reconstruction started, but the project was unsuccessful and reconstruction has still not been completed.

Sports events and clubs

The 2017 European Beach Volleyball Championships was held from August 16 to August 20, 2017. The draw consisted of 32 men's & 32 women's teams, with 100,000 EUR prize money per gender. The best Latvian men's team of Aleksandrs Samoilovs and Jānis Šmēdiņš took home silver, losing 2–0 to Italy in the finals. The best Latvian's women's team of Tina Graudina and Anastasija Kravcenoka lost in the quarterfinals to Germany 2–0. A 2,800 stadium was purpose built on Majori beach, with near capacity for most games.

The 2012 Winter Swimming World Championships were hosted in Jūrmala in January with a then-record 1,129 participants attending. This made Latvia the 3rd international host since its inception in 2000 at Helsinki, Finland.

FK Spartaks is a Latvian football club in Jūrmala that plays its home matches in the 2,500 capacity Slokas Stadium. They won the Latvian Higher League football premiership in 2016 and 2017.

The Baltic Open tennis tournament, part of the WTA Tour, is held at the National Tennis Center Lielupe in Jūrmala in July, starting in 2019.

Personalities
The following people were born in Jūrmala:
Imants Ziedonis (1933–2013), poet
Ernests Gulbis (born 1988), tennis player
Roberts Bukarts (born 1990), ice hockey player
Jelizaveta Polstjanaja (born 2003), rhythmic gymnast

Festivals
During the Soviet era, Jūrmala was a venue for various festivals, including the pop music festival "Jūrmala" (1986–1993).

From 2001 onwards Jūrmala hosted the "New Wave" competition for young pop singers from all over Europe. It also hosted the "Singing KiViN" event each July. Due to a ban of several Russian media personalities from entering Latvia, both competitions were moved from Jūrmala in 2015.

The Jūrmala International Piano Competition, arranged by the City Council and the Latvian Piano Teachers Association in collaboration with the Ministry of Culture of Latvia, for pianists of all nationalities aged 19 years and under, was established in 1994 and is held every two years in the "Dzintari" concert hall. As the International Academic Music Competition (with various categories), it reached its 11th Season in 2010.

Transport

Railway 

The railway Riga-Tukums was built in 1875–1877. The route chosen included the narrow isthmus between Lielupe and the Gulf of Riga. A stretch of 13 km of the line runs within a kilometre of the sea, and there are ten stations within easy walking distance from the beach. This was a big boost to the development of Jūrmala as a series of resorts along the coast. In 1912 a direct train connection was established with Moscow. The railway through Jūrmala is currently double-track and electrified. The current railway stations in Jūrmala, sorted from east to west, are Priedaine, Lielupe, Bulduri, Dzintari, Majori, Dubulti, Jaundubulti, Pumpuri, Melluži, Asari, Vaivari, Sloka and Ķemeri.

Roads 
A six lane road, designated A10 and E22, connects Riga to Jūrmala. A road toll is required from non-residents to pass the 4-lane bridge over Lielupe (built in 1962) and drive into Jūrmala. A railway overpass was built at Dzintari Station in 1976, giving a fast four-lane traffic flow into central Jūrmala.

Air 
Riga International Airport is only 18 km from central Jūrmala (Majori). Confusingly, Jūrmala Airport, a former Soviet air base, is further away (39 km) from central Jūrmala, near Tukums.

Demographics

As of 1 January 2019, the city had a population of 49,325.

Mayor

 Rihards Pētersons (1991)
 Ligita Začesta (1991-1994)
 Andrejs Inkulis (1994-1997)
 Leonīds Alksnis (1997-2001)
 Dainis Urbanovičs (2001-2003)
 Juris Hlevickis (2003-2005)
 Inese Aizstrauta (2005-2006)
 Raimonds Munkevics (I term) (2006-2008)
 Ģirts Trencis (2008-2009)
 Raimonds Munkevics (II term) (2009-2010)
 Romualds Ražuks (2010)
 Gatis Truksnis (I term) (2010-2013)
 Juris Visockis (2013)
 Gatis Truksnis (II term) (2013-2016)
 Rita Sproģe (acting) (2016)
 Gatis Truksnis (III term) (2016-2017)
 Rita Sproģe (2017)
 Gatis Truksnis (IV term) (2017-present)

Twin towns — sister cities

Jūrmala is twinned with:

 Admiralteysky District (Saint Petersburg), Russia
 Alushta, Ukraine
 Anadia, Portugal
 Anaklia, Georgia
 Ashdod, Israel
 Cabourg, France
 Eskilstuna, Sweden
 Gävle, Sweden
 Jakobstad, Finland
 Jilin, China
 Kazan, Russia
 Khanty-Mansiysk, Russia
 Palanga, Lithuania
 Pärnu, Estonia
 Samarkand, Uzbekistan
 Shenyang, China
 South-Western Administrative Okrug (Moscow), Russia
 Terracina, Italy
 Tsqaltubo, Georgia
 Türkmenbaşy, Turkmenistan

References

External links

 

History of Jurmala
Jūrmala (Latvia)

Photos and videos
 360° QTVR fullscreen panoramas of the Jurmala city
 Images from Jurmala 
 Panorama of Jurmala (WebCam), balticlivecam.com

 
Cities in Latvia
Gulf of Riga
Kreis Riga
Populated coastal places in Latvia
Republican cities of Latvia
Spa towns in Latvia